Anambodera is a genus of beetles in the family Buprestidae, containing the following species:

 Anambodera clarki Westcott, 2001
 Anambodera gemina (Horn, 1878)
 Anambodera lucernae (Knull, 1973)
 Anambodera lucksani Walters, 1982
 Anambodera nebulosa (Horn, 1894)
 Anambodera palmarum (Timberlake, 1939)
 Anambodera santarosae (Knull, 1960)

References

Buprestidae genera